Events in the year 1983 in the Republic of India.

Incumbents
 President of India – Zail Singh
 Prime Minister of India – Indira Gandhi
 Chief Justice of India – Yeshwant Vishnu Chandrachud

Governors
 Andhra Pradesh – K. C. Abraham (until 15 August), Thakur Ram Lal (starting 15 August)
 Assam – Prakash Mehrotra 
 Bihar – Akhlaqur Rahman Kidwai 
 Gujarat – Sharda Mukherjee (until 6 August), K.M. Chandy (starting 6 August)
 Haryana – Ganpatrao Devji Tapase 
 Himachal Pradesh – A. K. Banerjee (until 15 April), Hokishe Sema (starting 15 April)
 Jammu and Kashmir – B. K. Nehru 
 Karnataka – Ashoknath Banerji 
 Kerala – P. Ramachandran 
 Madhya Pradesh – 
 until 20 September: B. D. Sharma 
 20 September-7 October: G. P. Singh
 starting 7 October: B. D. Sharma
 Maharashtra – Idris Hasan Latif 
 Manipur – S. M. H. Burney 
 Meghalaya – Prakash Mehrotra 
 Nagaland – S. M. H. Burney 
 Odisha – Cheppudira Muthana Poonacha (until 17 August), Bishambhar Nath Pande (starting 17 August)
 Punjab – 
 until 7 February: Marri Chenna Reddy 
 7 February-21 February: Surjit Singh Sandhawalia
 21 February-10 October: Anant Prasad Sharma
 starting 10 October: Bhairab Dutt Pande
 Rajasthan – Om Prakash Mehra 
 Sikkim – Homi J. H. Taleyarkhan 
 Tamil Nadu – Sundar Lal Khurana 
 Tripura – S. M. H. Burney 
 Uttar Pradesh – Chandeshwar Prasad Narayan Singh 
 West Bengal – Bhairab Dutt Pande (until 10 October), Anant Prasad Sharma (starting 10 October)

Events
 National income - 2,250,742 million
 February – Bandit queen Phoolan Devi surrenders.
 January - Rail Mazdoor Union formed by George Fernandes.
 18 February – Nellie massacre: over 2,000 people, mostly Bangladeshi Muslims, were massacred during the Assam agitation.
 25 June – India wins the cricket World Cup for the first time.

Law

Arts and literature
Ardh Satya wins Filmfare Best Movie Award.

Sport
25 June – India wins the First Cricket World Cup at Lords under Kapil Dev.

Births
24 January  D. Imman, film composer and singer.
3 February – T.R. Silambarasan, Actor and Filmmaker
6 February – Angad Bedi, actor, model and cricketer.
6 February – Sreesanth, cricketer.
19 March  Karthik Subbaraj, film director and producer.
4 May  Trisha Krishnan, actress.
15 May  Santhosh Narayanan, music composer and singer.
20 May – N. T. Rama Rao Jr., actor.
25 May - Kunal Khemu, Actor
16 July – Katrina Kaif, actress
28 June – Jaiveer Shergill, politician.
7 July  Rishab Shetty, actor and director.
19 July – Sindhu Tolani, actress
27 July – Soccor Velho, footballer (died 2013).
28 July  Dhanush, actor, producer, lyricist and playback singer.
14 August – Jennifer Kotwal, actress.
31 August – Ira Singhal, Indian Administrative Service officer.
17 September- Sanaya Irani, actress.
2 November – Nitin Menon, cricket umpire
16 November –  Thaman S, music composer and playback singer.
23 November – Karan Patel, actor.
30 November – Nisha Kothari, actress.

Deaths
11 June – Ghanshyam Das Birla, businessman (born 1894).
17 November – E. P. Poulose, politician (born 1909).

Date unknown 
Fatima Begum, actress and India's first female film director (born 1892).
V. Ishwaraiah, pharmacology professor (born 1898).

References

See also 
 List of Bollywood films of 1983

 
India
Years of the 20th century in India